A Few Days of Respite is a 2011 French-Algerian drama film written and directed by Amor Hakkar. It competed in the World Cinema section at the 2011 Sundance Film Festival.

Cast
 Marina Vlady as Yolande
 Amor Hakkar as Moshen
 Samir Guesmi as Hassan

References

External links
 

2011 films
2011 drama films
2011 LGBT-related films
2010s French-language films
French drama films
French LGBT-related films
LGBT-related drama films
Algerian drama films
Films directed by Amor Hakkar
2010s French films